Pandale is a remote desert hamlet in  Val Verde County, Texas, United States. Its current population is smaller than in some previous years. It has been used as a starting point for canoeing and kayaking expeditions on the Pecos River. There are no businesses or services in Pandale.

Location and population
Pandale is located in Val Verde County at a Pecos River crossing 4 miles south of the conjunction of Texas Ranch to Market Road 1024 and the Langtry-Pandale Road, at which point the Pandale Church stands. Pandale can be reached by traveling north from Langtry on the Langtry-Pandale County Road, an unpaved caliche county road. The hamlet is located at a bridge crossing on the Pecos River. The town can also be reached from Interstate 10 by traveling south on CR 405 and Texas Ranch to Market Road 2083, which becomes unpaved heading south at the Crockett/Val Verde County line, or taking RM 2083 southwest from Ozona on I-10. 

The population in 2000 was 20. The permanent population has increased slightly due to ranch subdivisions and consists mainly of retirees. However, during the annual November to January deer hunting season, there is a huge influx of hunters, the vast majority of whom own hunting leases on small tracts of private property, usually consisting of raised hunting blinds located in close proximity to stocked, timed release corn and protein feeders.

History
Prehistoric people lived in the area and left relics, such as arrowheads, one of which is called a "Pandale".  The name of Pandale originates from its pan-like shape (pan) location in a valley (dale). The town began as a settlement where a crossing was established on the Pecos River. Around 1928, the town became a ranching community. There was once a school in the town but it closed when the school district was consolidated with the Comstock Independent School District in 1969. There is currently one small general store open part-time, and a cabin lodge near the Pecos River crossing, called Pandale Crossing River Resort. There is no longer a post office in the town.

Structures in Pandale consist of a two-story stone house once owned by Henry James Young Mills, an out building that was formerly a garage and general store, also owned by the Mills family and a single room school house which was also used for Sunday school.

Canoeing and Kayaking
Pandale is a popular point to begin a canoe or kayak journey down a wild part of the Pecos River. The multiday expedition requires rigorous preparation, good physical conditioning, and experience dealing with whitewater. Do not attempt this trip alone.

Education
It was formerly in the Pandale Common School District, but sometime prior to 1976 the Pandale district merged into the Comstock Independent School District. In 1964 Pandale's student count was 11.

The whole county is served by Southwest Texas Junior College according to the Texas Education Code.

References

External links
Photograph of structure in Pandale
Canoeing from Pandale Writer takes his son down the Pecos from Pandale and writes about it.

Unincorporated communities in Val Verde County, Texas
Unincorporated communities in Texas
Ghost towns in West Texas